Orwellion lineatum is a species of beetle in the family Cerambycidae. It was described by Skiles in 1985.

References

Elaphidiini
Beetles described in 1985